Antti Ore (born October 25, 1979) is a Finnish retired ice hockey goaltender. He played  with Espoo Blues in the Finnish SM-liiga.

Ore made his SM-liiga debut playing with Espoo Blues during the 2011–12 SM-liiga season.

References

External links

1979 births
Living people
Finnish ice hockey goaltenders
Espoo Blues players
KalPa players